Alfred Felton (8 November 1831 – 8 January 1904) was an Australian entrepreneur, art collector and philanthropist.

Biography
Alfred Felton was born at Maldon, Essex, England, the fifth child of six sons and three daughters of William Felton, a currier, and his wife Hannah. Felton travelled to Victoria on the ship California in 1853 intending to search for gold.

In 1857, he was in business in Collins Street, Melbourne, as a commission agent and dealer in merchandise, and in 1859 was an importer and general dealer. In 1861 he was in business in Swanston Street as a wholesale druggist.

In 1867 Felton went into partnership with Frederick Sheppard Grimwade and founded Felton Grimwade and Company, "wholesale druggists and manufacturing chemists". As the business grew over the years, the partners acquired interests in associated industries such as the Melbourne Glass Bottle Works, and Cuming Smith and Company (a fertiliser concern).

Felton also purchased two large estates, Murray Downs and Langi Kal Kal in Partnership with merchant and pastoralist Charles Gordon Campbell, a founding partner in Cuming Smith and Company. Upon Felton's death, his share in the Estates were sold to Campbell.

Felton's wants were few and he never married. He gave away considerable amounts to charity, and formed large collections of pictures and books which at times threatened to push him out of his rooms at the Esplanade Hotel in St Kilda, near Melbourne. He died there on 8 January 1904.

In 2005, Melbourne Grammar Grimwade House opened "The Alfred Felton Hall" in honour of Felton.

Felton Bequest
Alfred Felton had no direct descendants. In his will, he established a philanthropic trust, known as the Felton Bequest. The Bequest has been established to support culture and the community, with half the funding benefiting Victorian charities (particularly those that support women and children) and the other half used to acquire and donate art works to the National Gallery of Victoria.  After the payment of legacies and probate duties, the residue of the estate was £378,033, a huge sum, the equivalent of about A$35 million at 2000 values. The Gallery selected a number of works from Felton's personal collection for retention by it, and the remainder was sold at auction, the proceeds being added to the Bequest.

Over its life, the Felton Bequest has contributed funds to many charitable purposes and projects in Victoria and has acquired numerous works of art which it has donated to the National Gallery of Victoria. The acquisition funds available to the Gallery, through the Bequest, exceed those of London's National and Tate galleries combined.

Soon after the establishment of the Felton Bequest, the October Revolution occurred in Russia. The Bolshevik government that came to power there sold a  part of the collections of such museums as the Hermitage, Pushkin Museum, part of which was acquired by the Felton Bequest for the National Gallery of Victoria. The Felton Bequest has also been used to buy many masterpieces of Australian art.  Since the bequest was created, more than 15,000 art works have been acquired through the Felton Bequest, the current total value of which has been estimated at more than A$2 billion.  These works are the core of today's National Gallery of Victoria collection, and have made the Gallery's collections celebrated around the world.

References

J. R. Poynter, 'Felton, Alfred (1831 - 1904)', Australian Dictionary of Biography, Volume 4, MUP, 1972, p. 162. Retrieved on 18 October 2008

External links
Felton Society
Another Felton's biography
The Age article The bequest of a century

1831 births
1904 deaths
Australian philanthropists
Businesspeople from Melbourne
Philanthropists from Melbourne
English emigrants to colonial Australia
Australian art patrons
19th-century Australian businesspeople